Miranda Mulholland is a Canadian fiddle player and singer.

Biography
Mulholland is a member of Great Lake Swimmers, Belle Starr, and The Rattlesnake Choir as well as the founder and lead singer for the Roaring Girl Cabaret. She makes select appearances in the violin show Bowfire, and has played fiddle with Jim Cuddy, John Borra and Justin Rutledge, among others. Not limited to band performances, Mulholland has appeared in various theatre productions including Parfumerie and the world premiere of Spoon River with Soulpepper Theatre in Toronto.

In addition to varied studio work, she has toured extensively in Europe and North America with the Celtic rock bands The Mahones, The Peelers, The Paperboys, The Glengarry Bhoys and the alt-country band Luther Wright and the Wrongs. She was a member of the Canadian cast of Barrage and was the vocal and fiddle soloist for the Irish dance show Spirit of Ireland and Celtic Blaze.

Mulholland can be heard on records by Justin Rutledge, Sarah Slean, NQ Arbuckle and Kevin Quain, and her debut album for The Roaring Girl Cabaret is titled In Last Night's Party Clothes. 
She was born in Guelph, Ontario and was a violin student of the Guelph Suzuki School, and studied opera performance at the University of Western Ontario and McGill University.

On May 13, 2014, Mulholland released her debut solo album Whipping Boy produced by multi-instrumentalist Sean Watkins (Nickel Creek) on her own boutique label Roaring Girl Records. Roaring Girl Records is distributed by Fontana North. In addition, Mulholland founded Sawdust City Music Festival in Gravenhurst, Ontario and is on the Board of Governors of Massey Hall & Roy Thompson Hall.

In 2017 Mulholland formed a duo, Harrow Fair, with guitarist Andrew Penner.

Discography 
 Bob Egan, Alejandro Escovedo Benefit CD (2004) - fiddle/vocals
 The Glengarry Bhoys, Mill Sessions (2006) - fiddle/vocals
 The Mahones, Take No Prisoners (2006) - fiddle
 The Skye Consort, Courting Stories (2008) - vocals
 Justin Rutledge, Man Descending (2008) - violin
 NQ Arbuckle, XOK (2008) - fiddle
 Kevin Quain, Winter in Babylon (2008) - fiddle
 Sarah Slean, The Baroness (2008) - vocals
 Luther Wright, Man of Your Dreams (2008) - fiddle
 The Rattlesnake Choir, Live Music (2008) - fiddle/vocals
 The Roaring Girl Cabaret, In Last Night's Party Clothes (2008) - composer, vocals, violin
 Enter the Haggis, Gutter Anthems (2009) - vocals
 Celtic Blaze, Cast Album (2009) - fiddle/vocals
 Carolyn Mark and NQ Arbuckle, Let's Just Stay Here (2009) - fiddle
 The Rattlesnake Choir, Walkin' the Wire(2011) - fiddle/vocals
 Great Lake Swimmers, New Wild Everywhere (2012) - fiddle/vocals
 Amos the Transparent, Goodnight My Dear...I'm Falling Apart - fiddle/vocals
 Belle Starr, Belle Starr (2012) - fiddle/vocals
 Miranda Mulholland, Whipping Boy (2014) - vocals/fiddle

References

Canadian folk fiddlers
Canadian folk singers
Canadian folk rock musicians
Canadian women country singers
Musicians from Guelph
Living people
21st-century Canadian violinists and fiddlers
Great Lake Swimmers members
Year of birth missing (living people)
Canadian women folk singers
Canadian women violinists and fiddlers
Canadian country fiddlers